Konstantinos Paliatsaras is a Greek operatic tenor.

Early life and education
Born in Athens, Greece, Paliatsaras was attracted to Opera immediately after hearing Maria Callas at the age of 7. He was taught at the National Concervatoire in Athens by Professor Maggie Karatza and at the Royal Academy of Music in London by Professor Constance Shacklock. He also studied with Maestro Andreas Paridis.

Career
Paliatsaras debuted in 1987 at the National Greek Opera, as Alfredo in La Traviata followed by many leading roles, including Macduff (Macbeth), Don Carlos, Don Ottavio in Don Giovanni, Alfred and Prince Orlovsky in die Fledermaus, Rossillon in Die Lustige Witwe (1992, 2000), Die Hexe in Hansel und Gretel (1990), Almaviva in Il Barbiere di Siviglia, Nicias in Thais, Shober in Dreimadelhaus, Jimmy in the Rise and Fall of the City of Mahagonny (1999), Prince Shuisky and the fool in Boris Godunov, the fisherman in Die Kluge, La Vie parisienne, Les contes d'Hoffmann, Ariadne auf Naxos, Salome, Fadinard in Il cappello di paglia di Firenze (2001 and 2003), the latest in Mozart's Die Entfuhrung aus dem Serail (2007).

He was in a partnership with the baroque ensemble Capriccio Stravagante, directed by Skip Sempé, first at the inauguration opening of the Dimitri Mitropoulos hall, part of the Athens Megaron Concert Hall. At the Athens Megaron he also appeared as Apollo in Monteverdi's L'Orfeo with I Solisti Veneti, Carmen with Agnes Baltsa and Mahagonny.

A major landmark in his career was the tour in 30 cities and towns in France as Macheath in Kurt Weill's The Threepenny Opera with opera Eclate culminating in Paris 1990. In France he sang Verdi's Requiem at Angoulêmes, Cognac and Ruffec cathedrals (1990). Paliatsaras also presented Yiannis Markopoulos Liturgy of Orfeus in Vienna (1993), Brussels, Buenos Aires (2005), Ephesus (2004), Limassol, Athens and Ancient Marathon (2006). In the city of Thessaloniki, Paliatsaras sang Paris in Offenbach's La belle Hélène, Don Ottavio in Don Giovanni, and Le Nozze di Figaro. He recorded Monteverdi's Il Combattimento di Tancredi e Clorinda for DHM, BMG with Capriccio Stravagante, a performance that was honored with the Diapason d'Or 1992 reissued in 2004, giving a world tour in Cologne, Monaco, Paris, Normandy (1998), New York, and Seattle, U.S. At the Teatro Olympico, Vicenza, he sang the role of Apollo in Marco da Gagliano's opera La Dafne.

With the composer Vangelis, he recorded the CD El Greco with soprano Montserrat Caballé for Warner Bros. Has also appeared in many films, notably the Greek version of Disney's The Hunchback of Notre Dame singing the role of Clopin in Greek with great success. His most recent appearance in 2009 was as Alfredo in La Traviata at the municipal Theater of Kalamata, Greece in May and a concert in October at the Alexandria Opera House in Egypt. In April 2010, Haendel's Acis and Galatea with the Athens singers Theatro Tehnis Karolos Koun Athens.

Films
Oh Babylon (1989)
The Hunchback of Notre Dame (Greek version) (1996)
The Girl of Mani (1986)
Zoe (1995)
Absences (Απουσίες) (1987)

Discography
ALEXANDER (Sony Music) - 2004
EL GRECO (Warner) - 1998
REPRISE (Warner) - 1999
Il Combattimento di Tancredi e Clorinda (DHM-BMG) - 1993
Hristougenna Me Tin Katy - 1998
Under Acropolis lights - Paschalis Tonios (FM Records)
Foros Timis Ston Greco
EDMEA TETUA - Mixalis Koumpios (FM Records)

Repertoire
Claudio Monteverdi
Il Combattimento di Tancredi e Clorinda (Testo-Tancredi)
L'Orfeo (Apollo)
Il Ritorno d'Ulisse in Patria (Ulisse)
Schütz: Weihnachtshistorie - Evangelist
Die Sieben Worte am Kreuz - Christ
Handel: Messiah
Il Pastor Fido
Acis and Galatea
Bach: St Matthew Passion
St John Passion
Da Gagliano: La Dafne
Mozart: Le nozze di figaro
Don Giovanni
Die Entführung aus dem Serail
Donizetti: Lucia di Lammermoor
Don Pasquale
Rossini: Il barbiere di Siviglia
Verdi: La Traviata
Macbeth
Don Carlos
Orietta di Lesbo
Requiem
Bizet: Carmen
Massenet: Thais
Offenbach: The Tales of Hoffmann
La Vie parisienne
La Belle Helene
Massenet: Don Quichotte
Mussorgsky: Boris Godunov
Shostakovich: Lady Macbeth of Mtsensk
Tchaikovsky: Eugene Onegin
Richard Strauss: Ariadne auf Naxos
Salome
Orff: Die Kluge
Weill: Die Dreigroschenoper
Rise and Fall of the City of Mahagonny
Humperdinck: Hänsel und Gretel
Strauß: Die Fledermaus
Lehar: Die lustige Witwe
Britten: Peter Grimes
Albert Herring
Puccini: Madama Butterfly
Gianni Schicchi
Kalomiris: O Protomastoras
Sissilianos: I Fotia
Theodorakis: Kostas Karyotakis
Nezeritis: Psalmi tou David
Lena Platonos and Dimitris Marangopoulos: Asterinos and Chrissomaloussa

Sakellaridis: O Vaftistikos

References
The Athens Singers Acis & Galatea
Discography

Επίτομη ιστορία του Ελληνικού μελοδράματος και της Εθνικής Λυρικής Σκηνής (ΚΤΗΜΑΤΙΚΗ ΤΡΑΠΕΖΑ ΑΘΗΝΑ 1989)
Soundsofnepal

External links
Konstantinos Paliatsaras in Cyprus Operatic Stage
CAPRICCIO STRAVAGANTE
Konstantinos Paliatsaras Home page

Living people
Greek operatic tenors
Musicians from Athens
Year of birth missing (living people)
20th-century Greek male singers
21st-century Greek male singers